Montclair is an unincorporated community in Scotland County, North Carolina.  It lies at an elevation of 213 feet (65 m).

References

Unincorporated communities in Scotland County, North Carolina
Unincorporated communities in North Carolina